Lika (Liko) is a poorly documented Congolese Bantu language of uncertain affiliation, though it has been included in Boan.

References

External links
Selected Features of Syntax and Information Structure in Lika. (Bantu D.20), SIL International

Boan languages
Languages of the Democratic Republic of the Congo